Sunnybank may refer to:

Places

England 
 The Sunnybank area of Bury, Greater Manchester
 The Sunnybank Nature Reserve in Sheffield

Australia 
 Sunnybank, a suburb of Brisbane
 The electoral district of Sunnybank in Brisbane
 Sunnybank, a former town that was absorbed into Brisbane
 Sunnybank, an area of Aberdeen

United States 
 Sunnybank, a historic home in Hot Springs, North Carolina
 Sunnybank Kennels, founded by writer and dog breeder Albert Payson Terhune in Wayne, New Jersey